The black-breasted boatbill (Machaerirhynchus nigripectus) is a species of bird in the family Machaerirhynchidae.
It is found in New Guinea.
Its natural habitat is subtropical or tropical moist montane forests.

References

black-breasted boatbill
Birds of New Guinea
black-breasted boatbill
Taxonomy articles created by Polbot